Kenduli Sasan in Khurda district is the birthplace of the Sanskrit lyricist, Jayadeva. Medieval Indian literature refer to this place by the name Kenduvilva.

Location
Kenduli Sasan is a village in the banks of the Prachi river in Khurda district. It is only a few kilometers way from the holy city of Puri in Odisha, the seat of worship of the Hindu deity Jagannath. It has recently been recognized as the birthplace of the well-known Sanskrit lyricist, Jayadeva.

History
Kenduli Sasan has recently been identified as the birthplace of Jayadeva, who was born into an Utkala Brahmin family. It is also where the poet spent his childhood, with his parents, Bhojadeva and Vamavati. Being called a Sasana (which in ancient Odisha referred to a seat of Brahmin learning), this village appears to have been a centre for Hindu literature during the 10th and 11th centuries.
Jayadeva himself refers to his birthplace in the seventh song of the Gita Govinda as Kenduvilva, located by the sea:
Kinduvilva samudra sambhava Rohini ramanena

 
Prachi valley has a long history of worshipping Madhava, another name for Krishna. During Jayadeva's period, it was known as a religious place dominated by Vaishnava Brahmins.  Even today, the village of Kenduli Sasana is replete with images of Madhava. This indicates that the great poet must have been influenced by the devotional milieu in that area when he composed his magnum opus, the Gita Govinda.

Tourism
Kenduli Sasan has several brick temples and sculptures dating back to the time of Jayadeva in the tenth and eleventh centuries A.D., including those of deities Bhairava, Madhava, Ambika, Jageswari. Of significance is an image with heavy matted hair, and both arms broken, which is revered by the local people as the sage 'Jayadeva'. There is also a nearby temple with an image of Nrusimha carrying Lakshmi on his lap, one of the peculiarities of the Ganga dynasty. In fact, several such temples belonging to  Jayadeva's period have also been excavated here by the Archaeological Survey of India.  

The Jayadeva Sanskrutika Parishad, a cultural organization, has established a museum here containing images and other archaeological relics excavated here. An annual cultural function in honor of the poet Jayadeva is organized at Kenduli.

Controversy

There was an earlier controversy surrounding the birthplace of the poet Jayadeva, with a section of Bengali historians earlier claiming that another village with the same name in West Bengal was in fact the birthplace of Jayadeva. However, this theory appears to have been debunked recently.

See also

 Love Song of the Dark Lord
 Jayadeva
 Sanskrit literature
 Odissi
 Jagannath
 Jayadeva birth controversy

References

External links
Khorda District
Historical Perspective of Saint Poet Sri Jayadeva
Gita Govinda Kenduli
Historical Perspective of Saint Poet Sri Jayadeva
Jayadev : the Poet of Orissa
Jayadeva Foundation Trust

Jayadeva
Tourism in Odisha